Matteo Rivarola (died 1600) was a Roman Catholic prelate who served as Archbishop of Genoa (1596–1600).

Biography
On 29 April 1596, he was appointed during the papacy of Pope Clement VIII as Archbishop of Genoa.
On 3 May 1596, he was consecrated bishop by Antonmaria Sauli, Cardinal-Priest of Santo Stefano al Monte Celio. 
He served as Archbishop of Genoa until his death in 1600.

References

External links and additional sources
 (for Chronology of Bishops) 
 (for Chronology of Bishops) 

16th-century Italian Roman Catholic bishops
17th-century Italian Roman Catholic bishops
Bishops appointed by Pope Clement VIII
1600 deaths